Huluga Caves is a prehistoric site in the Philippines. It is located in the south end of Cagayan de Oro, about eight kilometers away. Composed of the two main caverns, it is situated on the eastern side of Cagayan de Oro River, along the brow of a vertical limestone cliff. The skeletal fragment from these caves were found belong to a child and a woman who inhabited in 377 A.D. This was based on the acid racemization done by Scripps Institution of Oceanography in La Jolla, California, USA.

Heritage 
Huluga is more than 80-feet high. It has an area of 50 meters across it northern and southern parts and measures 40 meters from the western edge of the precipice to the eastern slope. Cogon grass covers much of the area with big balete trees on both the northern and southern flanks. According to the Heritage Conservation Advocates, is "the home of the original native people of Cagayan de Oro". It is considered by many people, to be a sacred site which lacks protection and guidance by the government. Inside, they have found native tools such as glass beads, spoons, pendants, bracelets, stone tools, axe tip and pieces of iron.

In 1977, Burton sent bone samples taken from the caves for acid racemization to the Scripps Institution of Oceanography at the University of California in San Diego, California, and the sample was traced to 1600 BP or 377 A.D. Experts at the National Museum earlier said they were convinced that these caves were used by early Cagayanons from the late Neolithic Age to the Iron Age. At present, archeological artifacts can still be retrieved at the damaged portion of the open site.

Antonio Montalvan II, a former commissioner at the City Hall's Historical Commission, said no pits were ever dug by scientists at the open site but only surface scans. "It is therefore possible that the site will still yield unearthed artifacts and evidences of prehistoric Cagayan culture. This was in fact one of the recommendations of the National Museum team," he said.
Aside from its continuing archeological yields, the Huluga Site is believed to have been the site of prehistoric Cagayan de Oro known in written historical documents as "Himologan".

When the Spanish soldiers and Augustinian friars arrived in Cagayan in the year 1622, there was no town in the area that existed. They founded only a large cave fortress called Himologan. It was only in 1626 that Himologan's chief, Datu Salangsang and his people were persuaded by Fray Agustin de San Pedro to move the town site to the present-day Gaston Park and the San Agustin Cathedral.

See also 
 Macajalar Bay

Caves of the Philippines
Landforms of Misamis Oriental
Tourist attractions in Cagayan de Oro